Martyn Mazz (born Martijn Hubertus Johannes Terporten on October 13, 1983) is a Dutch artist and songwriter who was the lead vocalist in Van Gunn (2004–2008), 7 Days' Wonder (2009), primarily known as a singer in K-otic (2001–2003) and currently active solely as a songwriter.

Career
Mazz grew up in Maasbree, Netherlands.

Growing up with music such as the Beatles, Rolling Stones, Tom Petty and Thin Lizzy mainly caused by his parents' influence, and later, on the verge of the crossover from 1980s glamrock and 1990s grunge, getting a taste of those both worlds mainly through (according to his own biography) sneaking his way to his sisters' record shelf.

Since all this music was in English, at a young age he had developed an interest in lyrics and through reading lyrics at the same time learned his English.

In 2001, Mazz (at the time still known as Martijn Terporten) was picked to join a TV show called Starmaker in the Netherlands which was a pioneer of reality talent shows, through the TV show he ended up in a pop group called K-otic. However since Martyn has always listened to rock and hard rock, Martyn has stated that being in this group felt unnatural for him and thus taking the first possible ticket out which because of contracts was not until their last performance on January 26, 2003.

In the meanwhile Martyn always kept close ties with his original band Van Gunn, and they decided to move to Los Angeles to get more experience and to get on the road. In 2006 Van Gunn signed with Retone Records and recorded an album in Los Angeles which was to be their take off, however the band broke up due to differences in taste and how to move forward.

In 2008 Martyn moved to Rotterdam to start a study at a University for Music. While studying at the University, Porter formed a band called 7 Days' Wonder with whom he recorded a five song EP and toured in Japan and the Netherlands, in its short existence 7 Days' Wonder did not achieve any commercial success.

In September 2010 Martyn moved back to Los Angeles, where Martyn is mostly active as a songwriter and producer for other artists. 

In 2017 Martyn moved to Nashville, and in 2019 announced on his social media outlets and website that he will be using Martyn Mazz as his new stage name.

Discography
 Van Gunn – Van Gunn (Retone Records 2007)
 7 Days' Wonder – Phenomena (Evil Distortion Records 2009)
K-otic

|- align=center
|align=left|Bulletproof||2001||June 2, 2001||1||32|| Platina
|- align=center
|align=left|Live and more||2001||August 11, 2001||39||4|| Live album  / CD & DVD
|- align=center
|align=left|Indestructible||2002||September 21, 2002||2||16|| Goud
|}

References

External links
 
 World Music Database
 K-otic Music Encyclopedia (Dutch)
 Discography K-otic

1983 births
Living people
Dutch rock singers
Dutch songwriters
Dutch expatriates in the United States 
People from Peel en Maas
21st-century Dutch singers